Toribio Ayerza (1815–1884) was an Argentine physician who was co-founder of the Argentina Red Cross.

People associated with the International Red Cross and Red Crescent Movement
Argentine physicians
1815 births
1884 deaths
Burials at La Recoleta Cemetery